This is a list of tennis players who have represented the South Korea Davis Cup team in an official Davis Cup match. South Korea have taken part in the competition since 1960.

Players

References

Lists of Davis Cup tennis players
Davis Cup